Hydroxyprogesterone (OHP) may refer to:

 3α-Hydroxyprogesterone (3α-dihydroprogesterone)
 3β-Hydroxyprogesterone (3β-dihydroprogesterone)
 6β-Hydroxyprogesterone
 11α-Hydroxyprogesterone
 11β-Hydroxyprogesterone (21-deoxycorticosterone)
 15β-Hydroxyprogesterone
 16α-Hydroxyprogesterone
 17α-Hydroxyprogesterone
 20α-Hydroxyprogesterone
 21-Hydroxyprogesterone (11-deoxycorticosterone)

See also
 Progesterone
 Pregnanolone
 Pregnanedione
 Pregnanediol
 Pregnanetriol
 Dihydroprogesterone

Pregnanes